Opal Wilcox Barron (September 19, 1914 – September 11, 2010) was First Lady of West Virginia from 1961 to 1965. She was born in Boyer, West Virginia.

She married William Wallace Barron on February 15, 1936 in Amherst, Virginia. William Barron held several offices in state government before finally serving as Governor of West Virginia from 1961 to 1965, during which time Opal Barron served as First Lady, promoting the state's centennial celebration and persuading her husband to initiate a campaign to conserve the forests and beautify the state. 

In 1962, in the heat of the Cold War, she appeared on television to inform West Virginians how to equip and supply a fallout shelter. The entire family also participated in the Sabin vaccine program to prevent polio. After leaving office, Opal and William lived in Pompano Beach, Florida and Charlotte, North Carolina.

Following her husband's death, she lived in Greenville, South Carolina, where she died on September 11, 2010, shortly before her 96th birthday, following a period of declining health.

References

1914 births
2010 deaths
People from Pocahontas County, West Virginia
First Ladies and Gentlemen of West Virginia
People from Greenville, South Carolina
21st-century American women